The 1946 La Flèche Wallonne was the tenth edition of La Flèche Wallonne cycle race and was held on 9 June 1946. The race started in Mons and finished in Liège. The race was won by Désiré Keteleer.

General classification

References

1946 in road cycling
1946
1946 in Belgian sport